John Hertz may refer to:
 John D. Hertz (1879–1961), American businessman
 John H. Herz (1908–2005), American political scientist
 John Hertz (fan), American attorney and science fiction fan